The Fountain of Mercury is installed in Mexico City's Alameda Central, in Mexico. The fountain's statue depicts Mercury (sometimes referred to as Hermes).

See also
 Mercury fountain

References

External links

 

Alameda Central
Fountains in Mexico
Hermes
Mercury (mythology)
Nude sculptures
Outdoor sculptures in Mexico City
Sculptures of gods
Sculptures of men in Mexico
Statues in Mexico City